Charles Mopeli Stadium is located in Phuthaditjhaba, South Africa. It is mostly used by the PSL club Free State Stars and the National First Division club African Warriors. The stadium has a capacity of 35,000.

References

External links
Soccerway stadium info
Photos of Stadiums in South Africa at cafe.daum.net/stade

Soccer venues in South Africa
Sports venues in the Free State (province)
Maluti-a-Phofung